Giovani dos Santos Ramírez (born 11 May 1989) is a Mexican professional footballer. A versatile forward, dos Santos played as an attacking midfielder, winger, and secondary striker. He is an Olympic gold medalist.

Dos Santos began his football career at a very young age, being recruited by Spanish club Barcelona and played for their B team until age 18. He made his way up the ranks, eventually playing for the senior squad, making his debut in 2007. That year, he was named by World Soccer Magazine as one of the "Top 50 Most Exciting Teen Footballers". After playing one season, Dos Santos was transferred to Premier League club Tottenham Hotspur in 2008 in search for more playing time. Though he would stay with the club until 2012, his time there was mostly spent away on loan, at Ipswich Town, Galatasaray and Racing de Santander, with varying degrees of success. Spurs eventually sold dos Santos to Mallorca in 2012, and he was sold a year later to Villarreal. After a three-year stint, he was sold to LA Galaxy in July 2015, who went on to buy out his contract and release him prior to the 2019 season.

Dos Santos was a member of the Mexico under-17 team that won the 2005 FIFA U-17 World Championship held in Peru. He made his debut for the senior national team in a 1–0 victory over Panama on 9 September 2007, and represented El Tri at the 2010, 2014, and 2018 FIFA World Cups, along with the 2013 and 2017 FIFA Confederations Cup. With Mexico, Dos Santos has won the CONCACAF Gold Cup in 2009, 2011 and 2015, scoring in the 2009 and 2011 finals and winning the MVP award in 2009. He was also a member of Mexico's team that won the gold-medal at the 2012 Summer Olympics.

Club career

Barcelona

Born in Monterrey, Nuevo León, Dos Santos joined Barcelona's academy of La Masia at age 13 and played for Barcelona's Juvenil A category, where he helped his team to make a comeback in the league and win the regional title. This title allowed them to participate in the Youth Copa del Rey, where they faced other regional champions, among them their historic arch-rivals, Real Madrid. Dos Santos once again played a significant role during the tournament and helped the team win the national title of the Juvenil A category.

In 2006, Dos Santos was invited on the pre-season tour of Barcelona's senior squad; during a friendly match on 29 July 2006, he scored in his senior team debut game against Danish club AGF Aarhus. On 28 November 2006, Barcelona included Dos Santos in their 23-man squad for the FIFA Club World Cup in Japan.

During mid-2007, Dos Santos was once again invited to join Barcelona's senior squad on their pre-season tour. On 29 August 2007, he received dual nationality and was included in the official first team squad. He made his competitive and league debut on 2 September 2007 (at 18 years and 114 days) during a 3–1 home win against Athletic Bilbao, coming on for Thierry Henry in the 62nd minute.

Dos Santos made his UEFA Champions League debut on 20 September 2007 during a 3–0 home win against Lyon. He came on as a substitute for Xavi in the 79th minute.

On 17 May 2008, Dos Santos scored a hat-trick against Real Murcia, with a final score of 5–3, granting a victory to Barça on the team's last game of the 2007–08 season. It was also the last game Dos Santos played before joining Tottenham Hotspur.

Tottenham Hotspur
On 18 June 2008, Dos Santos passed a medical and agreed terms to complete his move to Tottenham from Barcelona. Barcelona reported that the transfer fee was €6 million with an additional €5 million payable depending on appearances for Tottenham.

The young Mexican was on target twice as Tottenham beat local Spanish side UD Tavernes in an 8–0 thumping on their 2008–09 pre-season tour. He also played in Spurs' other pre-season games including the 5–1 wins over Leyton Orient and Norwich City. He also scored the second goal in the 3–0 win over Borussia Dortmund to help Spurs to make it two wins out of two and take home the Feyenoord Jubileum Tournament trophy. He scored his first competitive goal for Spurs in the UEFA Cup on 26 February 2009 against Shakhtar Donetsk. After 12 first team appearances, he was sent on loan to Ipswich Town for the remainder of the season.

Dos Santos returned to Tottenham at the start of the 2009–10 season and his first game of the season came against Doncaster Rovers in the League Cup, in which he provided an assist. He was substituted off, however, due to an ankle injury early on in a League Cup game against Preston North End and managed to make only a substitute appearance in a 1–0 loss to Wolverhampton Wanderers.

Dos Santos' commitment was questioned by then Tottenham boss Harry Redknapp, who warned him to stay away from nightclubs and revealed that he was often late for training on Mondays.

Dos Santos scored and had an assist in Tottenham's UEFA Europa League group match against Shamrock Rovers on 29 September 2011 at White Hart Lane. On 7 January 2012, he scored a goal and completed an assist for a 3–0 win against Cheltenham Town in the third round of the FA Cup.

Ipswich Town (loan)
In March 2009, Dos Santos signed on loan at Ipswich Town until the end of the season. He made his debut on 14 March 2009, coming on as a substitute against Reading. He scored his first league goal and the equaliser in the following game against Burnley. He scored his second goal against Bristol City on Easter Monday, a 94th-minute penalty to equalise for Ipswich. He also claimed an assist and a goal from the penalty spot in Ipswich's 3–2 win over local rivals Norwich City a week later. He finished his loan with four goals in eight appearances.

Galatasaray (loan)
In January 2010, Dos Santos signed for Turkish club Galatasaray on loan for the remainder of the 2009–10 season, with an option to purchase him at the end of that period. The move reunited the player with Frank Rijkaard, his former coach at Barcelona. On 31 January, Dos Santos made his debut coming on as a 58th-minute substitute for Emre Çolak in a Süper Lig game against Denizlispor, a 2–1 victory. He returned to Tottenham in the summer having failed to score for Galatasaray, and stayed there for half a season before being loaned to La Liga club Racing de Santander in January.

Racing Santander (loan)
On 31 January 2011, Dos Santos joined La Liga side Racing de Santander on loan until the end of the season from Tottenham. He made his debut for his new club on 5 February 2011 as a substitute against Real Zaragoza, drawing the game 1–1. He scored his first goal as a substitute against Villarreal in the 68th minute on 27 February 2011. Dos Santos scored a brace in a 3–2 win league match over Hércules.

Mallorca

It was reported that Dos Santos had told Tottenham that he wanted a move in the summer of 2012 or else he would leave on a free transfer during the next transfer window. His agent stated there was interest from Serie A club Inter Milan. as well as Sevilla.

On 31 August 2012, Dos Santos signed a four-year deal with Spanish outfit Mallorca, being introduced as their new number 9. On 22 October, he made his debut for Mallorca, playing 60 minutes and assisting both goals in a 3–2 away defeat to Sevilla. He played another 60 minutes on 28 October in a 5–0 home defeat to Real Madrid. Dos Santos scored his first goal for Mallorca against Espanyol on 18 January 2013. Though Mallorca would finish the season in 18th place and was relegated, Dos Santos was a mainstay in the squad, amassing 32 total appearances and finished as their top goal-scorer with six goals as well as seven assists.

Villarreal
On 9 July 2013, Dos Santos completed a much speculated move to recently promoted side Villarreal for a reported €6 million. He finished the 2013–14 season with 11 goals and 8 assists, helping the club finish the season in sixth place.

LA Galaxy
On 15 July 2015, the Major League Soccer club LA Galaxy announced the signing of dos Santos as a Designated Player, in a reported US$7 million deal.

On 6 August, dos Santos made his competitive debut and scored his first competitive goal for the Galaxy in a CONCACAF Champions League fixture against Trinidadian side Central FC. Three days later, he made his MLS debut and scored a goal and provided an assist in the 3–1 win over Seattle Sounders FC.

On October 2, it was reported that dos Santos made that year's FIFA Ballon d'Or longlist.

In July 2016, dos Santos was included in the roster for the 2016 MLS All-Star Game. On 21 July 2016, he came off of the bench during the quarter-finals of the U.S. Open Cup, scoring within three minutes of coming onto the pitch. The goal help the Galaxy start a comeback leading to a 4–2 victory over Seattle Sounders to advance to the semi-finals for the first time in ten years.

In July 2017, Dos Santos was included in the roster for the 2017 MLS All-Star Game.

On 1 March 2019, LA Galaxy announced they had exercised its one offseason buyout of a guaranteed contract on dos Santos, thus releasing him from the team.

América
On 6 July 2019, Dos Santos officially joined Mexican side Club América. He played in the Liga MX for the first time after reaching a three-year agreement with América, being handed the number 10 shirt. In his first Súper Clasico against Guadalajara on 28 September, dos Santos suffered a thigh injury following a tackle from Antonio Briseño, with the defender piercing dos Santos' skin with his studs and leaving a deep gash in his right leg. He was stretchered off the field and immediately taken to a nearby hospital. Club América later released a statement revealing the player had suffered a wound in the quadriceps of the right thigh and would require surgery, thereby ruling him out of action for up to six weeks. Club América chose not to extend its working relationship with the player and released him on 15 June 2021.

International career

Youth
Dos Santos participated at the 2001 Danone Nations Cup that was held at the Parc des Princes, Paris, where 40 countries also participated. Mexico would finish the tournament fifth, and Dos Santos won the Golden Boot award for top goalscorer.

During the 2005 FIFA U-17 World Championship, which his team won, Dos Santos assisted half of the goals of Mexico during the tournament, a feat that won him the Adidas Silver Ball as the second best player of the tournament, finishing behind only to Brazilian midfielder Anderson.

In the U-20 World Cup Qualifiers, Dos santos scored twice; once against St. Kitts and Nevis in the 86th minute and the second against Jamaica in the 56th minute. He was forced to sit out the last game for precautionary reasons against Costa Rica, as he had received a yellow card in the previous match. The game ended in a 1–1 draw, but Mexico still qualified, finishing top of the regional group.

During the 2007 FIFA U-20 World Cup, Mexico was placed in Group C, where they were drawn against Gambia, Portugal and New Zealand. On 2 July 2007, Dos Santos and the rest of the Mexico team played against Gambia and won 3–0, with Dos Santos opening the scoring in the second half with a volley into the top left-hand corner from outside of the box. He then played against Portugal, where Mexico won 2–1, scoring the opening goal from the penalty spot. As Mexico had already qualified from the group, he was rested for the game against New Zealand. In the round of 16, Mexico played against Congo and Dos Santos returned to the starting line-up and yet again opened the scoring with a goal from the penalty spot in a match that Mexico won 3–0. In the quarter-finals, Mexico was eliminated by Argentina by an own goal on the second-half, which was the only goal of the game in a 1–0. Dos Santos was awarded the Adidas Bronze Ball.

In June 2012, Dos Santos was called up to play with the under-23 squad that would participate at the 2012 London Olympics. On 29 July, he started on the bench but later scored his first two goals against Gabon, earning Mexico a 2–0 win. Dos Santos scored his third goal of the tournament on 4 August against Senegal, scoring a crucial tie breaking goal in the 98th minute of extra time to give Mexico a 3–2 lead, which eventually led to a 4–2 win. He was in the starting XI for the semi-final match against Japan and played the first half of the game, but was substituted out for Raúl Jiménez in the 46th minute due to an injury, which ultimately ruled him out of the final against Brazil. Dos Santos was, however, on the bench and watched Mexico defeat Brazil 2–1 at Wembley Stadium.

Senior

Dos Santos earned his first selection in the senior team roster when Hugo Sánchez picked him for exhibition games against Panama and Brazil. Dos Santos appeared for the first time for Mexico in a 1–0 victory over Panama on 9 September 2007 wearing the number 10 jersey. The match was abandoned at half time because of heavy rain. He scored his first two goals for Mexico on 24 June 2009 in a friendly match against Venezuela, a game in which he was also named Man of the Match.

Dos Santos scored his third goal for Mexico on 19 July in the 2009 CONCACAF Gold Cup quarter-final game against Haiti in the 42nd minute and also recorded two assists in the 4–0 victory. On 26 July 2009, he helped Mexico end a ten-year drought of victory against the United States on American soil with a 5–0 victory that helped secure Mexico's fifth CONCACAF Gold Cup. He was named player of the tournament.

On 5 September 2009, Dos Santos contributed to all three goals in a 3–0 win over Costa Rica in the 2010 FIFA World Cup qualification stages. He scored the first goal from outside the penalty box with his preferred left foot and assisted in the following two goals.

When his brother Jonathan dos Santos was cut from Mexico's final 23-man squad for the 2010 World Cup, his father Zizinho said that Giovani was very hurt and claimed he was unsure whether he would play in the World Cup.

At the 2010 World Cup, Dos Santos started in every game for Mexico as a right winger. He completed 138 passes without providing an assist. He was voted runner-up for the FIFA Young Player of the Tournament award, which eventually went to Thomas Müller of Germany.

Dos Santos was called up to play the 2011 CONCACAF Gold Cup after a good mid-season loan to Racing de Santander. On 9 June 2011, he scored a brace against Cuba in a 5–0 win. In the final match against the United States, he scored in a 4–2 win by dribbling inside the box against goalkeeper Tim Howard and chipping the ball into the top-left corner over Eric Lichaj – that goal was named as the best goal of the tournament.

Dos Santos was called up by Miguel Herrera to play the 2014 World Cup. He played in Mexico's World Cup opener against Cameroon, and on 29 June 2014, opened the scoring in a 2–1 round of 16 defeat against the Netherlands with a left-footed long range strike.

In May 2018, Dos Santos was named in Mexico's preliminary 28-man squad for the 2018 FIFA World Cup in Russia, and in June, was ultimately included in the final 23-man roster for the tournament.

Style of play
A quick, skillful and creative player, Dos Santos is capable of playing in several offensive positions. He is usually deployed as a winger or as an attacking midfielder, and has even been used as a supporting striker. A technically gifted playmaker who possesses great flair and dribbling skills, he has been described as a "clever" and "sharp" player who has the capacity to both score goals and create chances for teammates. As a youngster, he drew attention to himself as a precocious talent, and in 2010 he was named by Don Balón as one of the 100 best young players in the world born after 1989.

Personal life
Dos Santos is the son of former Afro-Brazilian footballer Zizinho, who played for Mexico clubs América and León in the late 1980s. His mother, Liliana Ramírez, is Mexican. Dos Santos has two brothers and two half-brothers; the elder, Éder, played for América's reserves team as a defensive midfielder before retiring in 2009, and his younger brother, Jonathan, currently plays for América. Dos Santos has appeared on the cover of the MLS custom editions of FIFA 16 and FIFA 17.

Career statistics

Club

1.Includes Copa del Rey, FA Cup, and U.S. Open Cup
2.Includes UEFA Champions League, UEFA Europa League, and CONCACAF Champions League
3.Includes English League Cup, MLS Cup Playoffs, and Leagues Cup

International

Scores and results list Mexico's goal tally first, score column indicates score after each dos Santos goal.

Honours
América
Campeón de Campeones: 2019

Mexico U17
FIFA U-17 World Championship: 2005

Mexico U23
Olympic Gold Medal: 2012

Mexico
CONCACAF Gold Cup: 2009, 2011, 2015

Individual
FIFA U-17 World Championship Silver Ball: 2005
FIFA U-20 World Cup Bronze Ball: 2007
CONCACAF Gold Cup Golden Ball: 2009
CONCACAF Gold Cup All-Tournament Team: 2009
CONCACAF Gold Cup Best Goal: 2011
MLS Best XI: 2016
MLS All-Star: 2016, 2017

See also
List of footballers with 100 or more caps

References

External links

 
 
 
 
 
 

1989 births
Living people
Mexican people of Brazilian descent
Sportspeople from Monterrey
Footballers from Nuevo León
Association football midfielders
Association football forwards
FC Barcelona Atlètic players
FC Barcelona players
Tottenham Hotspur F.C. players
Ipswich Town F.C. players
Galatasaray S.K. footballers
Racing de Santander players
RCD Mallorca players
Villarreal CF players
LA Galaxy players
Club América footballers
Segunda División B players
La Liga players
Premier League players
English Football League players
Süper Lig players
Major League Soccer players
Designated Players (MLS)
Major League Soccer All-Stars
Liga MX players
Mexico youth international footballers
Mexico under-20 international footballers
Olympic footballers of Mexico
Mexico international footballers
2009 CONCACAF Gold Cup players
2010 FIFA World Cup players
2011 CONCACAF Gold Cup players
2011 Copa América players
Footballers at the 2012 Summer Olympics
2013 FIFA Confederations Cup players
2014 FIFA World Cup players
2015 CONCACAF Gold Cup players
2017 FIFA Confederations Cup players
2018 FIFA World Cup players
CONCACAF Gold Cup-winning players
Olympic gold medalists for Mexico
Olympic medalists in football
Medalists at the 2012 Summer Olympics
FIFA Century Club
Mexican expatriate footballers
Mexican expatriate sportspeople in Spain
Mexican expatriate sportspeople in England
Mexican expatriate sportspeople in Turkey
Mexican expatriate sportspeople in the United States
Expatriate footballers in Spain
Expatriate footballers in England
Expatriate footballers in Turkey
Expatriate soccer players in the United States
Mexican footballers